Marko Lazarević (born 28 February 1994) is a Serbian footballer who plays as goalkeeper for Radnički Beograd on loan from Partizan.

Club career
After passing the Partizan youth school, Lazarević started his senior career with Teleoptik, earning 3 caps in the 2012–13 Serbian First League season. In summer 2013, he signed with Napredak Kruševac, but he left the club at the beginning of 2014, and joined Sinđelić Beograd for the next six months.

After a season he spent as a captain of Brodarac 1947 in the Serbian League Belgrade, making 27 league caps, Lazarević moved to Rudar Pljevlja in summer 2015. After the club got eliminated in UEFA qualifications, he returned to Brodarac 1947 for the rest of the 2015–16 season. During the season, Lazarević made 28 caps and also scored 2 goals in matches against Dorćol and IMT, both from penalty kicks.

In summer 2016, Lazarević made a deal with Serbian First League side Bežanija, where he 15 appearances for the first half-season. On 28 January 2017, Lazarević signed with Rad.

In summer same year, Lazarević moved to Portuguese side Arouca, signing with the club for the 2017–18 LigaPro season. At the beginning of 2018, Lazarević signed with Radnički Beograd.

In July 2018, Lazarević rejoined Partizan for his second spell with the club, where he passed youth categories. He signed a one-and-a-half year contract keeping him until the end of 2019. Shortly after he returned to Radnički Beograd on one-year loan deal.

Career statistics

References

External links
 
 
 

1994 births
Living people
Footballers from Belgrade
Association football goalkeepers
Serbian footballers
FK Teleoptik players
FK Napredak Kruševac players
FK Sinđelić Beograd players
FK Rudar Pljevlja players
FK Bežanija players
FK Rad players
FK Radnički Beograd players
FK Partizan players
Serbian First League players
Serbian expatriate footballers
Serbian expatriate sportspeople in Montenegro
Expatriate footballers in Montenegro
Serbian expatriate sportspeople in Portugal
Expatriate footballers in Portugal
F.C. Arouca players